KLAU-LP was a low-power television station in Redlands, California, transmitting from Mount Wilson, and broadcasting in analog on UHF channel 45 as an independent station. Founded January 4, 1991, the station was owned by TV45 LLC. Its programming schedule was entirely devoted to airing infomercials.

On January 24, 2005, Gerald Benavides sold KLAU-LP to TV45 LLC (with Arthur Liu as president). 

The station's license was cancelled by the Federal Communications Commission on January 9, 2013, due to KLAU-LP having been silent since October 1, 2011.

External links

-LP
Television channels and stations established in 1991
Defunct television stations in the United States
Television channels and stations disestablished in 2013
1991 establishments in California
2013 disestablishments in California
LAU-LP